German–Turkish relations have their beginnings in the times of the Ottoman Empire and they have culminated in the development of strong bonds with many facets that include economic, military, cultural and social relations.  With Turkey as a candidate for the European Union, of which Germany is the largest member, and the existence of a significant Turkish diaspora in Germany, these relations have become more and more intertwined over the decades. Relations with Turkey significantly deteriorated after the 2016–17 Turkish purges including the arrest of journalists such as Die Welts Deniz Yücel.

History

Medieval and Early Modern periods

Wars between the Holy Roman Empire and Sultanate of Rum

 Crusade of 1101 (1101)
Battle of Dorylaeum (1147)
Battle of Philomelion (1190)
Battle of Iconium (2010)

Wars between the Holy Roman Empire and Ottoman Empire

Battle of Nicopolis (1396)
Battle of Mohács (1526)
First Turkish Siege of Vienna (1529)
Little War in Hungary (1530–1552)
Italian War of 1536–38
Siege of Buda (1541)
Italian War of 1542–46
Siege of Esztergom (1543)
Siege of Nice (1543)
Italian War of 1551–59
Long Turkish War (1591–1606)
Turkish Siege of Érsekújvár (1663)
Battle of Saint Gotthard (1664)
Great Turkish War (1683–1699)
Second Turkish Siege of Vienna (1683)
Battle of Párkány (1683)
First Holy League Siege of Buda (1684)
Holy League Siege of Érsekújvár (1685)
Second Holy League Siege of Buda (1686)
Siege of Pécs (1686)
Second Battle of Mohács (1687)
Holy League Siege of Belgrade (1688)
Turkish Siege of Belgrade (1690)
Battle of Slankamen (1691)
Battle of Lugos (1695)
Battle of Ulaş (1696)
Battle of Zenta (1697)

Late 19th century and World War I

 Baghdad Railway
 Ottoman–German Alliance
 Pursuit of Goeben and Breslau
 Middle Eastern theatre of World War I
 Germany's role in the Armenian Genocide

The German proposals to build a railway system toward Baghdad alarmed the British, for it threatened British control over the links to India. However, these issues were peacefully resolved in February 1914, and did not play a role in the July Crisis that ended in the Great War.

The Ottoman–German Alliance was an alliance between the German Empire and the Ottoman Empire made on August 2, 1914, shortly following the outbreak of World War I. The alliance was created as part of a joint-cooperative effort that would strengthen and modernize the failing Ottoman military, as well as provide Germany safe passage into neighboring British colonies. The treaty came from the initiative of the Ottomans. It was replaced in January 1915 by a full-scale military alliance that promised Ottoman entry into the war.<ref>Hew Strachan, The First World War: Volume I: To Arms. Vol. 1. Oxford University Press, 2003) pp 644-93.</ref>Frank G. Weber, Eagles on the Crescent: Germany, Austria, and the diplomacy of the Turkish alliance, 1914-1918 (Cornell University Press, 1970). The Central Powers of World War I would eventually be made up of both the Germans and the Ottomans, as well as the Austro-Hungarian Empire and Bulgaria.

German General Otto Liman von Sanders was given command of the Ottoman Fifth Army defending Gallipoli.

Generals Erich von Falkenhayn and Otto Liman von Sanders commanded the Ottoman Yildirim Army during the Sinai and Palestine Campaign.

World War II

During World War II, Turkey maintained diplomatic relations with Germany until August 1944. The German–Turkish Treaty of Friendship was signed on 18 June 1941. In October 1941, the "Clodius Agreement" (named after the German negotiator, Dr. Carl August Clodius) was achieved, whereby Turkey would export up 45,000 tons of chromite ore to Germany in 1941–1942, and 90,000 tons of the mineral in each of 1943 and 1944, contingent on Germany's supplies of military equipment to Turkey. The Germans provided as many as 117 railway locomotives and 1,250 freight rail cars to transport the ore. In an attempt to prevent the supply of this strategic mineral to Germany, the United States and the United Kingdom went on a spree of what was termed "preclusive buying," buying out Turkish chromite even if they did not need so much of it. As a part of the "package deal," the Anglo-Americans bought Turkish dried fruit and tobacco as well.

In August 1944, the Soviet Army entered Bulgaria and cut overland contact between Turkey and the Axis powers. Turkey severed its diplomatic and commercial relations with Germany, and on February 23, 1945, declared war on Germany.

 Political relations 
 Accession of Turkey to the European Union 

Germany's support to the Turkish bid has not been consistent in the German political arena.  Support has varied over time; for example one former Chancellor, Helmut Kohl, expressed opposition on the issue, while another, Gerhard Schröder, was seen to be a staunch supporter.

German Chancellor Angela Merkel advocated a "vaguely defined partnership" and has opposed full membership of Turkey to the EU. Current Turkish Prime Minister Recep Tayyip Erdoğan said in response in July 2009, "We will never accept a privileged partnership. We want full membership into the EU. We don't want anything else other than full membership.”

In 2006, Merkel said "Turkey could be in deep, deep trouble when it comes to its aspirations to join the European Union" regarding its refusal to open up its ports to European Union member Cyprus. She added:
We need an implementation of the Ankara Protocols regarding unrestricted trade with Cyprus too. Otherwise, the situation becomes very, very serious when it comes to the continuation of Turkey's accession negotiations. I appeal to Turkey to do everything to avoid such a complicated situation and not to lead the European Union into such a situation.

Merkel also said that she could not imagine negotiations continuing without concessions made by Ankara toward opening up its ports to Cypriot ships. The Turkish Government responded by demanding that the EU lift its embargo on the Turkish-controlled part of the island in return.

On 20 June 2013, in the wake of Ankara's crackdown on mass demonstrations in Taksim Square and throughout the country, Germany blocked the start to new EU accession talks with Turkey. According to the Financial Times, one Turkish official said that such a move could potentially break off political relations with the bloc. "The EU needs Turkey more than Turkey needs the EU," Egemen Bagis, Turkey's EU minister stated. "If we have to, we could tell them, "get lost.'" Germany says that its reservation stems from a technical issue, but Angela Merkel has described herself as "shocked" after Ankara's use of overwhelming police force against mostly peaceful demonstrators.

On 25 June EU foreign ministers backed a German proposal to postpone further EU membership talks with Turkey for about four months due to the Turkey's handling of the protests. A delay in opening new chapters for Turkey would raise new doubts about whether the country should ever be admitted to the European Union. In early June in comments on Turkey's possible membership German Chancellor Angela Merkel did not address the compromise proposal but said Turkey must make progress on its relations with EU member Cyprus to give impetus to its membership ambitions.

 EU sanctions 
In December 2020, German Chancellor Angela Merkel was among the EU leaders who opposed sanctions against Turkey, due to its gas drilling activities in the Mediterranean and foreign policy in general.

 Diplomatic incidents 
In August 2018, German firemen removed a four-meter golden statue of Turkish President Recep Tayyip Erdoğan in Wiesbaden on security grounds after it provoked an angry response from local people.
In October 2021, in the wake of the appeal for the release of Turkish activist Osman Kavala signed by 10 western countries, Turkish president Recep Tayyip Erdoğan ordered his foreign minister to declare the German ambassador persona non grata, alongside the other 9 ambassadors. However, the ambassadors did not receive any formal notice to leave the country and Erdoğan eventually stepped back.
In April 2022, Turkey condemned Germany's summoning of its ambassador and called in Germany’s ambassador Jürgen Schulz in a tit-for-tat move amid a row over the jailing of Turkish philanthropist Osman Kavala for life after being convicted of trying to overthrow the government by financing protests.

In May 2022, Foreign Minister Mevlüt Çavuşoğlu summoned the German and French ambassadors to Turkey to protest events organized by the Kurdistan Workers' Party (PKK) in both countries.  

In July 2022, the website of Deutsche Welle (DW) was blocked by an Ankara court after it refused to comply with a request to obtain a broadcast licence; DW had argued that being overseen by the country’s broadcast regulator would lead to demands that would be tantamount to censorship.

 State visits 

In 2006, Chancellor Angela Merkel visited Turkey for talks with Prime Minister Recep Tayyip Erdoğan on bilateral relations and to discuss accession of Turkey to the EU.

In 2008, Prime Minister Recep Tayyip Erdoğan visited Berlin and met Chancellor Merkel, and also visited Munich. He suggested during the visit that the German government establish Turkish medium schools and that German high schools hire more teachers from Turkey.

In 2011, Prime Minister Recep Tayyip Erdoğan made another visit to Germany During a speech in Düsseldorf, he urged Turks in Germany, to integrate, but not assimilate, a statement that caused a political outcry in Germany.

In 2018 in advance of the Erdogan state visit, the Erdogan Not Welcome association organised protest demonstrations with about 80-200 participants in Berlin, Essen and Bielefeld. For Erdogan's supporters in Turkey and abroad, the most significant event was the opening of a new multimillion-euro mega mosque in the cathedral city of Cologne. The mosque is run by the DITIB, an Islamic organization in Germany controlled by the Turkish government. It is situated in the Ehrenfeld district of Cologne, also collquially known as "Little Istanbul". The visit prompted criticism towards German president Frank-Walter Steinmeier who hosted a state banquet. from Deniz Yucel, a German-Turkish journalist who was jailed for a year in Turkey. Yucel called the visit a betrayal of all those who longed for a free, democratic and secular society in Turkey. German authorities warned Erdogan from using the visit for public campaigning.

 Economic relations 
Germany and Turkey have held strong economic ties with one another throughout time. Machinery, electrical goods and motor vehicles and supply parts for the automobile industry account for a particularly large portion of German exports to Turkey. Textiles/leather goods and food, and increasingly motor vehicles and electronic goods, are the principal German imports from Turkey. At present, companies owned by Turkish businessmen in Germany employ approximately 200 thousand people. The annual turnover of these companies
has reached 45 billion marks. More than three million German tourists visit Turkey annually. More than 4000 German companies are active in Turkey. Germany has turned out to be the number one partner of Turkey in fields such as foreign trade,
financial and technical cooperation, tourism and defense industry.

In 2020, Germany was the biggest trade partner of Turkey, they had a bilateral trade volume of $38 billion. German companies invested nearly €25 billion in Turkey's energy sector.

 Arms deals 
German Emperor Wilhelm II visited Istanbul in 1889 to secure the sale of German-made rifles to the Ottoman Army.

Turkey is an operator of the German Type 214 submarine. Moreover, Turkish Altay tanks rely on German MTU engines and RENK transmissions. Germany had also provided technical assistance in developing and operating drones, Leopard tank 2A4, KORKUT anti-aircraft system, PorSav missiles, MILGEM warship, Airbus A400M Atlas and MEKO frigates. As of July 2021, six German submarines were to be delivered to Turkey in 2022, in addition to five other Reis-class submarines in the next few years in a deal worth around $4 billion.

 Relationship between Turkish and German political parties 
 HDP and German green party 

In May 2015, the German party Alliance '90/The Greens encouraged Turkish citizens living in Germany to vote for the Turkish Party HDP in the upcoming June 2015 Turkish general election. The MP Cem Özdemir of the Green Party, a prominent opponent of the politics of Turkish president Recep Tayyip Erdoğan, was given a personal security detail of  three agents at the Munich Security Conference in 2018, after the Turkish security detail allegedly has identified him as a terrorist.  

 AKP and CDU 
On 16 February 2004, Angela Merkel, then chairwoman of the German opposition party CDU, met with representatives of the ruling Turkish party AKP. The press response was somewhat perplexing, as for example, the German magazine Der Spiegel first reported of a "Anti-Türkei-Reise" (Anti-Turkey-voyage) and only hours later that "CDU will mit islamischer AKP kooperieren"  (CDU wants to cooperate with Islamic AKP). On 31 July 2016, the German Sunday newspaper Bild am Sonntag reported, that the "Union der Vielfalt", a group of members of the CDU warned the party leadership against infiltration from the AKP.

 Recep Tayyip Erdoğan and FDP politician Wolfgang Kubicki 
In September 2022, Recep Tayyip Erdogan has filed a lawsuit against Free Democratic Party (FDP) politician and Vice-President of the Bundestag Wolfgang Kubicki for allegedly having insulted him.

 Turkish diaspora 

With an estimated number of at least 2.1 million Turks in Germany, they form the largest ethnic minority. The vast majority are found in Western Germany.

Based on good Turkish-German relations from the 19th century onwards, Germany promoted a Turkish immigration to Germany. However, large scale didn't occur until the 20th century. Germany suffered an acute labor shortage after World War II and, in 1961, the Federal Republic of Germany (West Germany) officially invited Turkish workers to Germany to fill in this void, particularly to work in the factories that helped fuel Germany's economic miracle. The German authorities named these people Gastarbeiter (German for guest workers). Most Turks in Germany trace their ancestry to Central and Eastern Anatolia. Today, Turks are Germany's largest ethnic minority and form most of Germany's Muslim minority.

 Turkey's purges 

On August 14, 2018, Turkish police arrested another German citizen on terrorism-related charges. German authorities said nine German nationals were in detention in Turkey for "political reasons" at that time.

In October 2018, Germany has warned citizens visiting Turkey to be extra cautious about their social media feeds in response to a spate of cases of Germans arrested for criticism of the Turkish government. “In some cases merely ‘liking’ another's post of that nature is enough,” The Germany Foreign Ministry said that even private comments could be risky. “Non-public comments on social media can be forwarded to Turkish authorities via denunciations,”

Turkish espionage in Germany

In July 2015, Der Tagesspiegel newspaper reported that German federal prosecutors were looking into claims that three men - two Turks and a German national - were instructed by MIT to spy on Erdogan critics in Cologne, particularly Kurds and members of the Muslim minority Alevi community.

In 2016, Bundestag Parliamentary Oversight Panel members demanded answer from German government about the reports that Germans of Turkish origin are being pressured in Germany by informers and officers of Turkey's MIT intelligence agency. According to reports Turkey had 6,000 informants plus MIT officers in Germany who were putting pressure on "German Turks". Hans-Christian Ströbele told that there was an "unbelievable" level of "secret activities" in Germany by Turkey's MIT agency. According to Erich Schmidt-Eenboom, not even the former communist East German Stasi secret police had managed to run such a large "army of agents" in the former West Germany: "Here, it's not just about intelligence gathering, but increasingly about intelligence service repression." German lawmakers have called for an investigation, charging that Turkey is spying on suspected Gulen followers in Germany.

In March 2017, the Turkish secret intelligence service MIT was accused of conducting espionage of more than 300 people and 200 associations and schools linked to supporters of exiled Fethullah Gülen. Boris Pistorius, interior minister for Lower Saxony State, called this "intolerable and unacceptable", stating that "the intensity and ruthlessness with which people abroad are being investigated is remarkable". A German security official said that "we are horrified at how openly Turkey reveals that it is spying on Turks living here". On 30 March 2017 Interior Minister Thomas de Maiziere expresses suspicions that the move may have been intended to weigh on Turkish-German relations − "to provoke us in some way". The appallment was deepened when it was revealed that the 300 persons included politicians, including Michelle Müntefering.

In October 2017, according to German press reports officials working in Germany's immigration authorities pass on information about Turkish asylum seekers to Turkey. In many cases, even their locations were also revealed, that even their families did not know for security reasons. These incidents showed that Turkish spies may have infiltrated German authorities. In addition, Herbert Reul, the interior minister for the German state of the North Rhine-Westphalia, submitted a report to the state parliament, alleging that the Turkish-German organisation Osmanen Germania works with MIT. The organisation denied the accusations. In July 2018, Germany banned the organisation on allegations it is involved in organized crime and represents a threat to the general public.

In October 2021, German authorities arrested a Turk in a hotel at Düsseldorf for spying on behalf of Turkey. Police found a pistol, ammunition and a list with the names Gulen supporters.

Operation Irini

A Turkish freighter intercepted by German frigate Hamburg on 23 October 2020 with citing arms embargo to Libya. However, according to German officials, there was nothing about arms and allowed the passing of the ship. Turkish officials stated that this is a violation of maritime laws because Germany did it without permission from Turkey.

Resident diplomatic missions

Germany
Ankara (Embassy) 
In 1923 the embassy was moved from Istanbul to Ankara. The embassy houses offices and official apartments, as well as the residence of the German ambassador since 1928.
Istanbul (Consulate-General)
Following the relocation of the embassy to Ankara in 1923 the former embassy building in the Beyoğlu district of Istanbul houses the Consulate General and the German Archaeological Institute. 
Izmir (Consulate-General)
Antalya (Consulate-General) 

Turkey
Berlin (Embassy)
Berlin (Consulate-General)
Köln (Consulate-General)
Düsseldorf (Consulate-General)
Essen (Consulate-General)
Frankfurt (Consulate-General)
Hamburg (Consulate-General)
Hannover (Consulate-General)
Karlsruhe (Consulate-General)
Mainz (Consulate-General)
München (Consulate-General)
Münster (Consulate-General)
Nürnberg (Consulate-General)
Stuttgart (Consulate-General)

Country comparison

See also

 Turkey–European Union relations
 Böhmermann affair
  
 Armenian genocide denial
 Germans in Turkey
 Germans in Middle East
 Turks in Germany
 Turks in Europe
Grey passport scandal 
 Russia–Turkey relations
  
  
 European Union–NATO relations
 Islam in Germany
 Kurds in Germany

 References 

Further reading

 Flaningam, M. L. "German Eastward Expansion, Fact and Fiction: A Study in German Ottoman Trade Relations 1890-1914" Journal of Central European Affairs (1955) 14#4 pp 319–333.
 McMurray, Jonathan S. Distant ties: Germany, the Ottoman Empire, and the construction of the Baghdad railway'' (Greenwood, 2001).

External links 

Turkish Ministry of Foreign Affairs about relations with Germany
Turkish Secretariat General for EU Affairs

 
Turkey
Bilateral relations of Turkey